Eleucadia Vargas Reyes (born February 14, 1970) is a female judoka from the Dominican Republic. She competed for her native country at two Summer Olympics: 1992 and 2000. Vargas won a total number of two bronze medals at the Pan American Games in the 1990s.

References
 

1970 births
Living people
Dominican Republic female judoka
Judoka at the 1992 Summer Olympics
Judoka at the 2000 Summer Olympics
Olympic judoka of the Dominican Republic
Judoka at the 1991 Pan American Games
Judoka at the 1999 Pan American Games
Pan American Games bronze medalists for the Dominican Republic
Pan American Games medalists in judo
Medalists at the 1991 Pan American Games
Medalists at the 1999 Pan American Games
20th-century Dominican Republic women
21st-century Dominican Republic women